The Georgian ambassador to the United Kingdom (known formally as the Ambassador Extraordinary and Plenipotentiary of Georgia to the Court of St James's) is the official representative of the president of Georgia and the Georgian Government to the monarch and government of the United Kingdom. The position is held by Sophie Katsarava.

List of representatives

See also 
 Embassy of Georgia, London
 Foreign relations of Georgia
 List of ambassadors of the United Kingdom to Georgia
 Georgia–United Kingdom relations

References 

 
United Kingdom
Georgia